The Bandini formula three is a racing car model produced from 1954 until 1958 by Bandini Automobili of Forlì.

This type, produced at the same two-seater sports was born in order to participate in the  engine capacity race-only category. This gave birth first to Formula Junior and later Formula Three.

The characteristics that make the Bandini F3 historically important are the unprecedented postponement of box differential and testing of disc brakes on all four wheels. Disc brakes had only recently appeared on racing cars with the advent of the 1951 C-type, which used them to great advantage at Le Mans. The advantages of disc brakes  were mainly limited solely to lower unsprung masses as the study of materials of seals of friction had not yet allow evolution that today poses this choice as a solution required the cars allocated to the races. They also helped avoid brake fade.

 

The box to postpone the transmission instead, a system also used in subsequent FJr. it offered a double advantage: making rapid replacement of differential gears that determine the final drive ratio, (allowing a rapid adaptation to the circuit) and, simultaneously, significantly lowering the driveshaft, which in turn governed the position of the driving seat. This allowed a lowering of center of mass with the consequent improvement of handling.

The racing debut occurred on July 1954 to the third edition of "Luigi Arcangeli Cup", raced on the Forlì circuit.

The same manufacturer Ilario Bandini, classified in second place in the race reserved for "single seater up to 750 cc" valid for the Italian championship.

The chassis

The chassis keeps the characteristics, materials and design, used for 750 torpedo sports two-seater, but the size, necessarily lower a car, make it possible to further cut the weight that descends so only .

 Structure and material: frame of elliptical section tubes, special steel aeronautics derivation; patent No. 499843
 Suspension:
 Front: Independent, triangles overlapping with shock hydraulic telescopic tilted and springs cylindrical helical coaxial; bar Account
 Rear: a bridge with two rigid leaf spring semiellittiche longitudinal and shock hydraulic vertical telescopic
 Braking system:
 Service: hydraulics, drum front and rear, as an alternative hydraulic disc on four wheels
 Parking: not found
 Steering: a worm
 Guide: single, central location
 Wheels: Ray Borrani
 Fuel tank: 
 Transmission: rear transmission with half shaft and central differential positioned reversed and box with quick change of relations (6 reports available)
 Weight: bare chassis 
 Weight total:

The engine

The three Bandini formula used the same engines which powered the two-seater sports the same period: Bandini-Crosley first and second series, although the duration of lesser races for single-seater allowed the use of modifications and adjustments "pushes" as an increase in the compression ratio or the use of alloy connecting rod.
 Positioning: forward longitudinal, 4-cylinder in-line
 Materials and particularity: base 5 media bench and sump of aluminium of 5 litres capacity, aluminium DOHC head with 8 valves inclined, cylinders dismantled in cast iron block.
 Bore: 
 Stroke: 
 Displacement: 
 Compression ratio: 11.2:1
 Power: 2 twin-choke (two-barrel) Weber carburetors double body 35DCO3 horizontal or vertical
 Power: 66 to 73 hp 9000 rpm
 Lubricate: Carter with wet gear pump and filter external wire mesh
 Cooling: forced liquid with centrifugal pump controlled by pulley and belt, cooler on the front
 Gearbox and clutch: 4 speed+ RG, clutch single dry disc
 Ignition and electrical equipment: coil and distributor on the head, battery 12 V and generator

The body 
The alloy body, made the Bandini were of two types; different especially on the front: a very similar to torpedo two-seater, with grid elements horizontal and vertical elliptical high and very rounded and the other lower and spigolosa with the air-intake front almost a semicircle. Both solutions were not welded to the body car but screwed to it, so as to enable the interchangeability as well as add convenience in the event of operations in the engine compartment or contacts to tender.
As the front, the tail and side panels of the engine compartment were easily dismantled. They have openings in gills of sharks in the two positions in relation to the role: the air fresh or sfoghi of warm air).
Their position reveals the use of different carburettors (horizontal or vertical).
Almost always present instead sfoghi large rectangular body on the car, between the engine compartment and the cockpit, where the body is deeply dug. To protect aerodynamics of the driver, only a small "slide" or a windshield that wraps the whole but for a few centimeters in height.
The tail, very short and at peak closed slightly above the rear axle at a point where goes also fin-rollbar, born immediately behind the driver.

See also
 Ilario Bandini
 Bandini Cars

Bandini vehicles
Formula Three cars
Sports cars
Cars introduced in 1954